Burke Mountain Ski resort is a mid-size ski resort open to skiing and snowboarding in northeast Vermont (aka Vermont's "Northeast Kingdom" ). It is located on Burke Mountain and is home to Burke Mountain Academy, a ski academy.

In May 2012, Burke Mountain Resort was purchased by the owners of nearby Jay Peak Resort. The new ownership has improved Burke's snow making capability. Burke Mountain Resort is a ski in/ski out resort that is positioned at the midway point of the mountain. The hotel has 116 rooms, and is open year-round. Behind the hotel is a mid-lodge called the Bear Den which features a full-service bar, soups and chili, and live music on Saturdays.

General description

The ski area has two main sections of terrain. 

The "Lower Mountain" consists of mostly Beginner terrain and is accessed by a high-speed detachable quad chairlift. There is also a "Bunny Slope" accessed by a J-bar surface lift. A beginner carpet lift was installed in 2010 to make the learning progression easier for first time skiers.  There are a couple of terrain parks and a beginner glade (Enchanted Forest) here as well. This section of the mountain also has lift served mountain biking during non-snow months. The main Sherburne Base Lodge services this section of the resort. This lodge contains the rental shop, restaurant/bar, retail shop, and cafeteria.

The "Upper Mountain" consists of predominantly Intermediate and Advanced terrain. Trails on the upper mountain are accessed via two lifts, a Leitner-Poma platter lift and a high-speed quad chairlift (Mid-Burke Express), installed for the 2011–2012 season. 
The fixed grip "Willoughby" quad summit lift was partially removed circa 2017, as it had only seen operation during busy days.
Trails vary from wide open groomed runs (Upper/Lower Dipper, Upper/Lower Willoughby), to steep ungroomed trails (Doug's Drop), to glades (Caveman, Throbulator, Jungle). 
The major trail visible from the Mid-Lodge (Upper/Lower Warren's Way) is the main training trail for Burke Mountain Academy and other local racing organizations. 
The intermediate/expert East Bowl trail is considered to be a signature "old New England style" trail due to its long, narrow, winding nature. There is a long traverse to and from this trail that comes with a "not snowboarder friendly" advisory. 
There is one "easy way" down the upper mountain via the "Deer Run" (formally "The Toll Road") trail (this is the auto toll road in the summer). This trail was reclassified from a beginner to an intermediate trail in the early 2000s due to the many intersections with a widened Super GS slope.  
The Mid-Burke Lodge services this section of the resort. This lodge contains a bar and a cafeteria.

Summer Activities

Summer activities include:
Lift served downhill mountain biking on 8 purpose built trails featuring constructed jumps and berms. The lower mountain trails are accessed from the base lodge using the Sherburne Express Quad lift.
The upper mountain has several expert mountain bike trails that are accessed by driving the toll road, a shuttle, or riding up the road. These trails are not lift served.

When the correct atmospheric conditions present themselves, Burke is also a popular location for Hang Gliding and Paragliding.

EB-5 fraud 
In 2008, a group headed by Miami businessman Ariel Quiros and the CEO of Jay Peak Resort, Bill Stenger, purchased Jay, which was conducting an EB-5 visa program to finance development of the ski area. Quiros persuaded the sellers to put the EB5 funds already raised into an account at Raymond James Financial, which employed his son-in-law, who helped to retitle the accounts in Quiros' name immediately before the closing of the sale of Jay. They transferred the funds to other accounts, misusing the EB-5 funds to pay part of the purchase price; they used more EB-5 funds raised later to complete the payments owed to the seller.

The resort company raised $250 million by 2010, for improvements at Jay and other nearby developments and purchases, including the 2012 purchase of Burke Mountain Ski Area, from 250 investors from 43 companies through the incentive of the federal EB-5 visa. Under this visa, every $500,000 invested in the U.S. that results in ten new jobs gains the investor permanent residence. By 2014, some investors had complained to the Vermont Department of Financial Regulation (DFR) and the U.S. Securities and Exchange Commission (SEC) that the resort company had abruptly reclassified their investments. The investigators found the resort company's answers to their questions about the use of the funds to be evasive. They eventually found that Quiros had diverted millions of the dollars raised for his personal use and that Stenger had lied to investors and the SEC about, among other things, the status of some of the construction projects, some of which were never built, including a biotechnology plant in Newport, Vermont.

On April 14, 2016, Jay Peak and Burke Mountain were seized by U.S. government officials. The  resorts remain operational under management of the SEC-designated receiver, Michael Goldberg. The SEC recovered $81 million from Quiros (including the ski area assets), who pleaded guilty in 2020 to federal crimes including wire fraud, money laundering and obstructing investigators. He was sentenced to five years in prison. Stenger cooperated with the investigation and pleaded guilty in 2021 to supplying false statements to federal investigators. He was sentenced to 18 months in prison and three years of supervisory release, and he was fined $250,000. a third conspirator, William Kelly, also received fines and a prison sentence. Raymond James Financial paid a $150 million settlement for its part in the fraud. The EB-5 investors may never receive most of their money back from the investment, but the receiver intends to continue trying to get their green cards approved.

References

External links

Ski areas and resorts in Vermont
Tourist attractions in Caledonia County, Vermont